The Wanting may refer to:
 The Wanting (Glenn Jones album)
 The Wanting (Cody Jinks album)